Della Mae is an American bluegrass band formed in Boston, Massachusetts, United States, in 2009. Their name, "Della Mae" comes from the song, "Big Spike Hammer."

Della Mae was formed by Kimber Ludiker, Amanda Kowalski, Grace Van’t Hof, and Avril Smith, and released their first EP, "Della Mae: Acoustic EP" in 2010. In 2011, when Celia Woodsmith joined the band, the group released their first album,  I Built This Heart.  Their second album, This World Oft Can Be, was nominated for a Grammy Award for Best Bluegrass Album at the 56th Grammy Awards in 2014.

In 2015, they released their third album, Della Mae. The group released Headlight in 2020.

Band members
 Celia Woodsmith - Vocals, Guitar, Washboard (2011–present)
 Kimber Ludiker - fiddle, vocals (2009–present)
 Avril Smith - Guitar, Vocals (2009-2011, 2019–present)
 Vickie Vaughn - Bass, Vocals (2020–present)
 Maddie Witler - Mandolin, Banjo (2020–2022)
 Jenni Lyn Gardner - mandolin, vocals (2009–2020)
 Zoe Guigueno - bass,  vocals (2015–2019)
 Courtney Hartman - guitar, banjo, vocals (2009–2018)
 Grace Van't Hof - Vocals, Banjo (2009–2011)
 Shelby Means - bass, vocals (2012–2015)
 Amanda Kowalski - bass, vocals (2009–2012)

Discography

References

American bluegrass music groups
Musical groups established in 2011
Musical groups from Boston
2011 establishments in Massachusetts